Fortaleza de São José da Ponta Grossa is a fort located on the northern end of Santa Catarina Island in the municipality of Florianópolis, capital of Santa Catarina state, in southern Brazil.

See also
Military history of Brazil

References

External links

Sao Jose
Buildings and structures in Santa Catarina (state)
Portuguese colonial architecture in Brazil